Andrews Quansah (born 23 March 1960), is a retired Ghanaian footballer who played as a goalkeeper.

Career

Playing career 
Andrews Quansah started his football career in 1970 with Back Arrows team in Tema. During his time he played for Accra Hearts of Oak, Great Olympics, Okwawu United, etc. He was part of the Black Meteors during the time of Mohammed Adu And Kwesi Appiah and won a medal around that time.

He has played with teammates such as Joe Amoateng, George Lamptey, Abedi Pele, James Kwesi Appiah among others.

Coaching career 
Andrews coached Prisco F.C, a Tema-based football club in Ghana.

References 

1960 births
Living people
People from Central Region (Ghana)
Accra Hearts of Oak S.C. players
Accra Great Olympics F.C. players
Okwawu United players
Ghanaian footballers
Ghana international footballers
Association football goalkeepers